Josh Pugh (born 20 August 1989) is an English stand-up comedian and actor.

Early life
Pugh was born in Nuneaton in 1989 and grew up in Atherstone, Warwickshire.

Career

Pugh began performing in 2014. He won new act competitions in both Birmingham Comedy Festival and Nottingham comedy festival in 2015, the Midland new act of the year in both 2014 and 2015, and the English Comedian of the Year in 2016.

He has appeared on Mock the Week, Hypothetical, Rosie Jones's Disability Comedy Extravaganza, Question Team and Mel Giedroyc: Unforgivable. As an actor, he appeared on Sneakerhead.

Pugh has written jokes for several shows, including 8 Out of 10 Cats Does Countdown, Never Mind The Buzzcocks, Newsjack and The Now Show.

He hosts a podcast, Josh And Phil's Knowledge Club, with Phil Pagett.

Personal life
Pugh is partially sighted and has played for England's Partially Sighted football team since 2012.

He lives in Coventry with his wife; they had a child in December 2021 via IVF.

References

External links

English male comedians
Living people
1989 births
21st-century English actors
People from Nuneaton
People from Atherstone
Actors from Coventry